Alberto I della Scala (died 3 September 1301) was lord of Verona from 1277, a member of the Scaliger family.

The son of Jacopino della Scala, he was podestà of Mantua in 1272 and 1275. In 1277, after the assassination of his brother Mastino, he inherited the seigniory of Verona.

Alberto died in Verona in 1301. His son Bartolomeo succeeded him. His other sons Alboino and Francesco (Cangrande) were also lord of Verona from 1304 and 1312, respectively. His daughter Costanza married Obizzo II d'Este, Marquis of Ferrara, as his second wife.

Sources

Scala, Alberto 1
Scala, Alberto 1
Alberto 1
Scala, Alberto 1
Burials at Santa Maria Antica, Verona
Lords of Verona